The 2012 Campeonato Sergipano de Futebol Profissional da Primeira Divisão - Série A1 (a.k.a. Sergipão 2012) was the 89th season of Sergipe's top professional football league. Associação Olímpica de Itabaiana won their 10th title

Format
The ten clubs were divided into two groups that will play in two tournaments. In the first tournament stage the teams from one group will play within their group in a single round-robin tournament. The two best teams from each group will advance to the playoffs and while the next best two will play for the Taça Cidade de Aracaju. In the second tournament stage the teams will play with against the teams in the other group in a single round-robin format.  The two best teams from each group will advance to the playoffs and while the next best two will play for the Taça Estado de Sergipe. The winner of both the Taça Cidade de Aracaju and Taça Estado de Sergipe will play for the state championship. If the same team wins both tournament, they are automatically declared the champion.

Qualifications and Relegation
The best two teams  will qualify for 2013 Copa do Brasil and the 2013 Copa do Nordeste. The best team not playing in Campeonato Brasileiro Série A, B, or C will qualify for 2012 Campeonato Brasileiro Série D. And the worst two teams  will be relegated to 2013 Second Division.

Participating teams

Taça Cidade de Aracaju
The 2012 Taça Cidade de Aracaju began on January 28 and ended on March 4.

First stage

Group A standings

Group B standings

Knockout phase

Bracket

Semifinals

Finals

Taça Estado de Sergipe
The 2012 Taça Estado de Sergipe began on March 28 and ended on May 13.

First stage

Group A standings

Group B standings

Knockout phase

Bracket

Semifinals

Finals

Superfinals

Overall standings

References

External links
Globoesporte Sergipe - Campeonato sergipano de 2012 

Sergipano
Campeonato Sergipano